The Lebanon Chix were a  minor league baseball team based in Lebanon, Pennsylvania. In 1949 and 1950, the Chix played as members of the  North Atlantic League and were a minor league affiliate of the St. Louis Cardinals. After qualifying for the 1949 playoffs, Lebanon won the 1950 North Atlantic League championship in the final season of play for the league. Lebanon hosted home games at Grimes Stadium, built by the owners of the Chix.

History 
Lebanon first hosted minor league baseball with a Lebanon team in the 1889 Middle States League. The Lebanon Chix were immediately preceded by the 1904 Lebanon team, which played as members of the Tri-State League.

Two local brothers had founded and supported the semi–pro "College Hill Chix" team beginning in 1945. Former major league player Jim Bucher managed the team beginning in 1946, leading the Chix to a 4th-place finish in the 1948 National Baseball Congress tournament in Wichita, Kansas. Following the 1948 season, owners of the semi–pro Chix team purchased the Bloomingdale Troopers of the North Atlantic League and moved the franchise to Lebanon, to play in the recently built Grimes Stadium. Brothers Cole and Charlie Grimes, local business owners, built the ballpark and were financers of the team.

Jim Bucher removed himself from field manager and served as business manager when the "Lebanon Chix" were formed. Bucher secured a major league affiliation for the franchise.

When minor league baseball returned to Lebanon in 1949, the Lebanon Chix became members of the eight–team Class D level North Atlantic League, playing as an affiliate of the St. Louis Cardinals. Lebanon joined the Bangor Pickers, Carbondale Pioneers, Hazleton Mountaineers, Mahanoy City Bluebirds, Nazareth Barons, Peekskill Highlanders and Stroudsburg Poconos in beginning league play on May 3, 1949.

The Lebanon Chix' home opener was an 8:30 night game against the Nazareth Barons. The opening ceremonies began at 8:00 P.M., featuring a flag raising and music by the Palmyra American Legion Band. General admission was $0.75, children $0.30 and reserved seats $0.95. Bus service was provided to the ballpark, leaving from 8th and Cumberland at 7:00 P.M.

In their first season, the Chix placed 2nd in the North Atlantic League regular season standings and qualified for the playoffs. With a record of 80–56, playing under manager Hal Contini, Lebanon finished 20.5 games behind the Stroudsburg Poconos, who finished with a 101–36 record. Beginning play at Grimes Stadium, Lebanon had home attendance of 33,000. In the 1949 playoffs, the Peekskill Highlanders defeated Lebanon 4 games to 1 in the 1st round.

In their final season, the Lebanon Chix captured the 1950 North Atlantic League championship. With Hal Contini returning as manager, the Lebanon Chix won the regular season pennant in the North Atlantic League. The Chix ended the 1950 regular season with a record of 87–46, to place 1st in the standings, finishing 5.5 games ahead of the 2nd place Stroudsburg Poconos. In the Playoffs, Lebanon defeated the Carbondale Pioneers 4 games to 3 to advance. In the Finals, the Lebanon Chix were leading Stroudsburg 3 games to 2 when the series was ended due to weather.

Following the 1950 season, the North Atlantic League folded. Lebanon, Pennsylvania has not fielded another minor league team.

The ballpark
The Lebanon Chix hosted 1949 and 1950 home minor league home games at Grimes Stadium. The ballpark was named for Cole E. Grimes and opened in 1946. The ballpark was also home to the Fredericksburg High School baseball games until 1958. Today, the grandstand has been repurposed as a storage facility. The location is US 22 & Main Street in Fredericksburg, Lebanon County, Pennsylvania.

Year–by–year records

Notable alumni
Jim Bucher (1948–1949, Executive)
Ken Boyer (1948) St. Louis Cardinals #14 Retired

References

External links
Baseball ReferenceGrimes Stadium photosGrimes Stadium photos

Defunct minor league baseball teams
Professional baseball teams in Pennsylvania
Defunct baseball teams in Pennsylvania
Baseball teams established in 1949
Baseball teams disestablished in 1950
1949 establishments in Pennsylvania
1950 disestablishments in Pennsylvania
North Atlantic League teams
Lebanon, Pennsylvania
St. Louis Cardinals minor league affiliates